Blue Lake is the largest of several small frozen lakes near Cape Royds, Ross Island, lying 0.5 nautical miles (0.9 km) north-northeast of Flagstaff Point. Named by the Nimrod Expedition (1907-09) on account of the intensely vivid blue color of its ice.

References

Lakes of Antarctica